Natalie Wojcik (born October 14, 1999) is an American artistic gymnast. She currently competes for the Michigan Wolverines women's gymnastics team, and is a four-time All-American.

Early and personal life 
Wojcik was born in Abington, Pennsylvania to Bernie and Suzy Wojcik. She grew up in Douglassville, Pennsylvania with three siblings, Nicole, Nadia and Noelle, who are all competitive gymnasts. Wojcik began gymnastics at the age of three. She is of Polish descent.

Career 
In the fall of 2018, Wojcik began attending the University of Michigan, joining the Michigan Wolverines women's gymnastics team. In her collegiate debut, she broke the school record of the highest all-around score (39.625) in a college debut with a 39.625; Wojcik also won three event titles (vault, bars and beam) at the same meet. She was named the WCGA Northeast Regional Gymnast of the Year and the Big Ten Freshman of the Year; she was named a two-time All-American for her freshman season: first team on balance beam, second team in the all-around.

In the post-season, Wojcik helped to lead her team to first place at the Big Ten Championships, becoming the Big Ten Floor and All-Around Champion, as well as second-place on vault and beam. Moreover, Wojcik was named to the All-Big Ten first team. At the NCAA National Championships, she became the Regional Floor Champion at the Ann Arbor regional, placed 5th with her team (despite posting the 4th highest score of the two semi-finals), and became the National Beam Champion with a score of 9.950.

Following her senior year in 2022, she was awarded the AAI Award. During her career at Michigan she earned 87 career event and all-around victories, as well as notching 108 career scores of 9.900 or higher. In June 2022, she was awarded the Excellence in Sports Award by the National Polish-American Sports Hall of Fame.

Regular season ranking

Career perfect 10.0s

Competitive history

NCAA

References 

Living people
1999 births
American gymnasts
Michigan Wolverines women's gymnasts
NCAA gymnasts who have scored a perfect 10